(born September 12, 1965 in Kanagawa Prefecture) is a Japanese actor. He is best known for playing Godzilla in the 2001 Millennium film GMK. He also provided motion capture for several video games.

Films
 1991 - Zeiram as Zeiram
 1994 - Zeiram 2 as Zeiram
 1995 - Gakko no Kaidan
 1996 - Gakkō no Kaidan 2
 1997 - Gakkō no Kaidan 3
 1996 - Gamera 2: Attack of Legion as Legion
 1996 - Rebirth of Mothra as Desghidorah
 1997 - Rebirth of Mothra II as Dagahra
 1997 - Homo erectus pekinensis Who are you? as Mammoth
 2001 - Godzilla, Mothra and King Ghidorah: Giant Monsters All-Out Attack as Godzilla
 2005 - Kamen Rider The First as Cobra
 2006 - Gamera the Brave as Zedus
 2009 - Deep Sea Monster Raiga as Raiga

Video games
 2004 - Metal Gear Solid 3: Snake Eater as Naked Snake
 2004 - Metal Gear Solid: The Twin Snakes as Solid Snake
 2003 - Resident Evil Outbreak
 2003 - Dino Crisis 3 as Jacob Ranshaw
 2001 - Metal Gear Solid 2: Sons of Liberty as Solid Snake
 2001 - Resident Evil – Code: Veronica X
 2001 - Onimusha: Warlords
 2000 - Resident Evil – Code: Veronica

References

External links
 
 Mizuho Yoshida at MobyGames

1965 births
Japanese male film actors
Living people
People from Kanagawa Prefecture